Benjamin Franklin Haines  (1876 – 1942) was a Massachusetts attorney and politician and a Florida businessman.  Haines served as a member of the Medford, Massachusetts Board of Aldermen, the Massachusetts House of Representatives, as the eighth Mayor of Medford, Massachusetts and as the Mayor of Altamonte Springs, Florida.

Early life 
Haines was born November 25th, 1876. He was the son of American businessman John DeMaugh Haines. and Kate Luslie (Phillips) was born in Boston, Massachusetts Haines on November 25, 1876.

Marriage 
On June 11, 1902 Haines married teacher Carrie Gibbs   Bly, the daughter of William L. Bly and Ella F. (Gibbs) Bly in New Bedford, Massachusetts.  They had two children, Webber Bly Haines, born April 3, 1906 and Lewis DeMaugh Haines.

Business career 
Beginning in 1900, Haines practiced law in Boston.

Mayor of Medford, Massachusetts
In the municipal elections of December 8, 1914 Haines was elected the Mayor of Medford, defeating two term Mayor Charies S. Taylor by 130 votes.

1917 Massachusetts Constitutional Convention 
In 1916 the Massachusetts legislature and electorate approved a calling of a Constitutional Convention.  In  May 1917, Haines was elected to serve as a member of the Massachusetts Constitutional Convention of 1917, representing the 26th Middlesex District of the Massachusetts House of Representatives.

Mayor of Altamonte Springs, Florida
In the municipal elections of 1931 Haines was elected the Mayor of Altamonte Springs, Florida.

Notes

References
 Commonwealth of Massachusetts: Journal of the Constitutional Convention of the Commonwealth of Massachusetts, pp. 7–8, 11, 27, 626, Wright & Potter Printing co., state printers,  (1919).
 Bridgman, Arthur Milnor: A Souvenir of the Massachusetts Constitutional Convention, pp.  27, (1919).
 Robison, Jim: Altamonte Springs, Mount Pleasant, S.C.: Arcadia Publishing, pp. 85.  (2002).

1876 births
1942 deaths
Citrus farmers from Florida
Boston University School of Law alumni
Brown University alumni
Massachusetts city council members
Massachusetts lawyers
People from Altamonte Springs, Florida
Mayors of Medford, Massachusetts
Members of the 1917 Massachusetts Constitutional Convention
Republican Party members of the Massachusetts House of Representatives
Politicians from Boston
Mayors of places in Florida
Florida Republicans
Lawyers from Boston
20th-century American politicians
20th-century American lawyers